Kasare may refer to several places in Maharashtra, India:

 Kasare, Dhule, a panchayat village in Sakri Taluka, Dhule District
 Kasare, Nandurbar, a village in Nawapur Taluka, Nandurbar District
 Kasare, Parner, a village in Parner Taluka, Ahmednagar District 
 Kasare, Sangamner, a village in Sangamner Taluka, Ahmednagar District